Eric Born (born 31 August 1970) is a Swiss businessman  and former judoka. He competed in the men's half-lightweight event at the 1992 Summer Olympics. He was also a European Judo Champion (1991).

Biography
Eric Born took up judo from a young age and won a gold medal at the 1991 European Judo Championships, which allowed him to compete at the 1992 Summer Olympics in Barcelona. But he was defeated in the first round. After Born's failure at the Olympics, he returned to judo and won a silver medal at the 1993 World Judo Championships. Following this Eric Born entered the business world and worked for several companies, notably becoming the CEO of Wincanton plc from 2010 to 2015, and then President and CEO of Swissport from August 2015 until the end of 2020. After an almost 2 year Sabbatical, he started as CEO of Grafton Group plc in November 2022. He has a master's in business administration (MBA) from the University of Rochester. He still remains active in judo.

References

External links
 

1970 births
Living people
Swiss male judoka
Olympic judoka of Switzerland
Judoka at the 1992 Summer Olympics
Place of birth missing (living people)
Swiss businesspeople
University of Rochester alumni
20th-century Swiss people
21st-century Swiss people